Peter S. Cohan is an American businessman, author and teacher. He is the founding principal of Peter S. Cohan & Associates, a management consulting and venture capital firm. He has completed over 150 growth-strategy consulting projects for global technology companies and invested in seven startups—three of which were sold for over $2 billion and his most recent—Sofi Technologies—went public in July 2021 at an $18 billion valuation.

Cohan is a Senior Lecturer of strategy at Babson College. He teaches business strategy, entrepreneurship, leadership, and management consulting to both undergraduate and graduate students. RETHINK Retail selected him as a Top 100 Retail Influencer in 2021 and 2022

Journalism
Cohan writes the Start-up Economy column for Forbes magazine, and "The Hungry Start-up" column for Inc magazine, Wall and Main, his Worcester Telegram & Gazette column, helped its Business Matters section win the 2012 New England Newspaper and Press Association award for the best Business page for papers over 30k circulation]. He is a member of the Wharton Blog Network, which received the Gold Award in the 2013 Council for Advancement and Support of Education (CASE) District II Accolades Awards program.

Personal life
From September 2004 to September 2008, Cohan served on the board of the Alzheimer's Association, Massachusetts Chapter. He is the brother of William D. Cohan.

Books
 Goliath Strikes Back: How Traditional Retailers Are Winning Back Customers from Ecommerce Startups (Apress: December 2020)
 Scaling Your Startup: Mastering the Four Stages from Idea to $10 Billion (Apress: January 2019)
 Startup Cities: Why Only a Few Cities Dominate the Global Startup Scene and What the Rest Should Do About It (Apress, February 2018) 
 Disciplined Growth Strategies: Insights From the Growth Trajectories of Successful and Unsuccessful Companies (Apress, February 2017) 
Hungry Start-up Strategy: Creating New Ventures with Limited Resources and Unlimited Vision (BK Business, 2012), 
Export Now: Five Keys to Entering New Markets (Wiley, 2011), co-authored with Frank Lavin, 
Capital Rising (Palgrave-Macmillan, 2010), co-authored by U. Srinivasa Rangan, 
You Can't Order Change (Portfolio, 2009), 
Value Leadership (Jossey-Bass, 2003), 
Net Profit: How to Invest and Compete in the Real World of Internet Business (Wiley, 2001), 
E -Profits by Peter S Cohan - The 12 Steps To Creating A State Of The Art E-Commerce Strategy For Any Size Business, 
The Technology Leaders: How America's Most Profitable High-Tech Companies Innovate Their Way to Success (Jossey-Bass, Publishers, 1997), 

He has also contributed to six compendiums of modern management.

References

External links

Living people
American businesspeople
American columnists
American male writers
Babson College faculty
Year of birth missing (living people)